Barrow-in-Furness power station supplied electricity to the town of Barrow-in-Furness and the wider area of Lancashire, England from 1899 to about 1960. It was owned and operated by Barrow-in-Furness Corporation until the nationalisation of the UK electricity supply industry in 1948. The power station was redeveloped throughout its operational life. Barrow-in-Furness Corporation also operated Coniston hydro-electric power station.

History
In 1894 Barrow-in-Furness Corporation applied for a Provisional Order under the Electric Lighting Acts to generate and supply electricity to the town. This was granted by the Board of Trade and was confirmed by Parliament through the Electric Lighting Orders Confirmation (No. 1) Act 1894 (57 & 58 Vict. c. xlix). The power station was built in Buccleugh Street (54°06'59"N 3°13'19"W) adjacent to the railway line, it first supplied electricity to the town in 1899.

Coniston power station was developed as a small hydro-electric plant in 1932 with a single water turbine, a second turbine was added in 1937. The installation initially supplied power for Barrow County Council and latterly for the village of Coniston.

The 120 MW Roosecote power station east of the town centre was first commissioned in September 1953. This was more efficient than the old Barrow power station which was gradually run-down and decommissioned in about 1960.

Equipment specification
In 1923 the steam generating plant at Barrow comprised:

 Coal-fired boilers generating up to 112,000 lb/h (14.11 kg/s) of steam, these supplied steam to:
 Generators
 3 × 75 kW reciprocating engines driving direct current (DC) generators
 2 × 150 kW reciprocating engines driving DC generators
 2 × 250 kW reciprocating engines driving DC generators
 1 × 1,000 kW steam turbo-alternator
 1 × 2,000 kW steam turbo-alternator
 1 × 3,000 kW steam turbo-alternator

These machines had a total generating capacity of 8,000 kW of alternating current and 1,025 kW direct current.

A variety of electricity supplies were available to consumers:

 3-phase, 50 Hz AC at 6,300 Volts, 380 V and 220 V.
 Direct current at 500, 440 and 220 Volts.
Coal could be delivered to the station from a siding off the railway just south of Barrow-in-Furness railway station.

New plant, 1950s
New plant was commissioned over the operational life of the station. In the late 1950s the plant at the station comprised:

 Boilers:
 3 × Stirling boilers with chain grate stokers, all with a final steam pressure of 200 psi (13.8 bar), and with capacities of :
 30,000 lb/h (3.78 kg/s) at 650 °F (343 °C);
 55,000 lb/h (6.93 kg/s) at 700 °F (371 °C);
 90,000 lb/h (11.3 kg/s) at 700 °F (371 °C)

The boilers had a total evaporative capacity of 175,000 lb/h (22.0 kg/s), and supplied steam to:

 Turbo-alternators:
 1 × Metropolitan Vickers 10 MW turbo-alternator, with Vickers condensing plant
 1 × Metropolitan Vickers 7 MW turbo-alternator, with Vickers condensing plant
 1 × Howden-Siemens 1 MW turbo-alternator, with Willans and Robinson condensing plant
 1 × Howden-Siemens 3 MW turbo-alternator, with Worthington Simpsons condensing plant
 1 × British Thomson-Houston 2 MW turbo-alternator, with Cole, Merchant and Morley's surface condensing plant

The total installed generating capacity was 23 MW, with an output capacity of 14 MW.

Condenser cooling water was cooled in three wooden cooling towers with a combined capacity of 0.45 million gallons per hour (0.57 m3/s) plus one concrete cooling tower with a capacity of 1.0 million gallons per hour (1.26 m3/s).

The corporation also operated Coniston water turbine generating station at Coniston. This comprised 2 × 150 kW Gilkes-Metropolitan-Vickers water turbo-alternator sets. These generated current at 450 Volts.

Operations

Operating data 1921–23 
The operating data for the period 1921–23 is shown in the table:

Under the terms of the Electricity (Supply) Act 1926 (16 & 17 Geo. 5 c. 51) the Central Electricity Board (CEB) was established in 1926. The CEB identified high efficiency ‘selected’ power stations that would supply electricity most effectively; Barrow was designated a selected station. The CEB also constructed the national grid (1927–33) to connect power stations within a region.

Operating data 1946
Barrow-in-Furness and Coniston power stations operating data for 1946 is given below.

The British electricity supply industry was nationalised in 1948 under the provisions of the Electricity Act 1947 (10 & 11 Geo. 6 c. 54). The Barrow-in-Furness electricity undertaking was abolished, ownership of Barrow-in-Furness and Coniston power stations were vested in the British Electricity Authority, and subsequently the Central Electricity Authority and the Central Electricity Generating Board (CEGB). At the same time the electricity distribution and sales responsibilities of the Barrow-in-Furness electricity undertaking were transferred to the North Western Electricity Board (NORWEB). At the time of nationalisation the undertaking supplied 23,825 customers over an area of 208 square miles (539 square kilometres).

Operating data 1954–63
Operating data for Barrow power station over the period 1954–59 is shown in the table:

Operating data for Coniston power station was as follows:

Closure
Barrow power station was decommissioned in about 1960. The buildings were subsequently demolished and the area has been redeveloped as housing.

Coniston power station was decommissioned in the 1960s.

See also
 Timeline of the UK electricity supply industry
 List of power stations in England

References

Coal-fired power stations in England
Demolished power stations in the United Kingdom
Former power stations in England
Former buildings and structures in Barrow-in-Furness